Knud Gleerup (1 December 1884 – 17 October 1960) was a Danish sculptor. His work was part of the sculpture event in the art competition at the 1936 Summer Olympics.

References

1884 births
1960 deaths
20th-century Danish sculptors
Male sculptors
Olympic competitors in art competitions
People from Copenhagen
Danish male artists
20th-century Danish male artists